Michael Lawrence Slive (July 26, 1940 – May 16, 2018) was an American attorney and college sports executive. Slive was the commissioner of the Southeastern Conference (SEC), a college athletics association, from 2002 until 2015. As part of his role as the SEC Commissioner, he served as the coordinator of the Bowl Championship Series for the 2006 and 2007 regular seasons. He was a member of the NCAA Division I Men's Basketball Committee through September 2009 and served as the chairman of the committee for the 2008–09 academic year. He retired as commissioner effective July 31, 2015.

Early life
A native of Utica, New York, Slive graduated from Dartmouth College with a Bachelor of Arts degree in 1962.  He earned a J.D. from the University of Virginia School of Law in 1965 and an LL.M. from the Georgetown University Law Center in 1966.

Career
Slive became the seventh commissioner of the SEC on July 1, 2002. He was the first commissioner of Conference USA from 1995 to 2002, and the first commissioner of the Great Midwest Conference upon its founding in 1991.

Early in his life, he practiced law in New Hampshire, serving as judge of the Hanover District Court from 1972 to 1977, and was a partner in a Chicago law firm. He was assistant director of athletics at Dartmouth College, assistant executive director of the Pacific-10 Conference, and director of athletics at Cornell University from 1981 to 1983. In 1990, he became senior partner and founder of the Mike Slive-Mike Glazier Sports Group, a legal practice specializing in representing colleges and universities in athletics-related matters.

Death
In his later years, Slive battled prostate cancer. He died on May 16, 2018, age 77, in Birmingham, Alabama. He is survived by his wife of 49 years, Liz, and their daughter, Anna.

References

1940 births
2018 deaths
Cornell University faculty
Cornell Big Red athletic directors
Dartmouth College alumni
Georgetown University Law Center alumni
Southeastern Conference commissioners
University of Virginia School of Law alumni
Businesspeople from Utica, New York
Lawyers from Birmingham, Alabama
20th-century American businesspeople
20th-century American lawyers